Sarcofahrtiopsis spathor is a species of fly. It was found in the Dominican Republic.

References

Sarcophagidae
Insects described in 2000